= Sophie Schubert =

German volleyball player (born 1997)

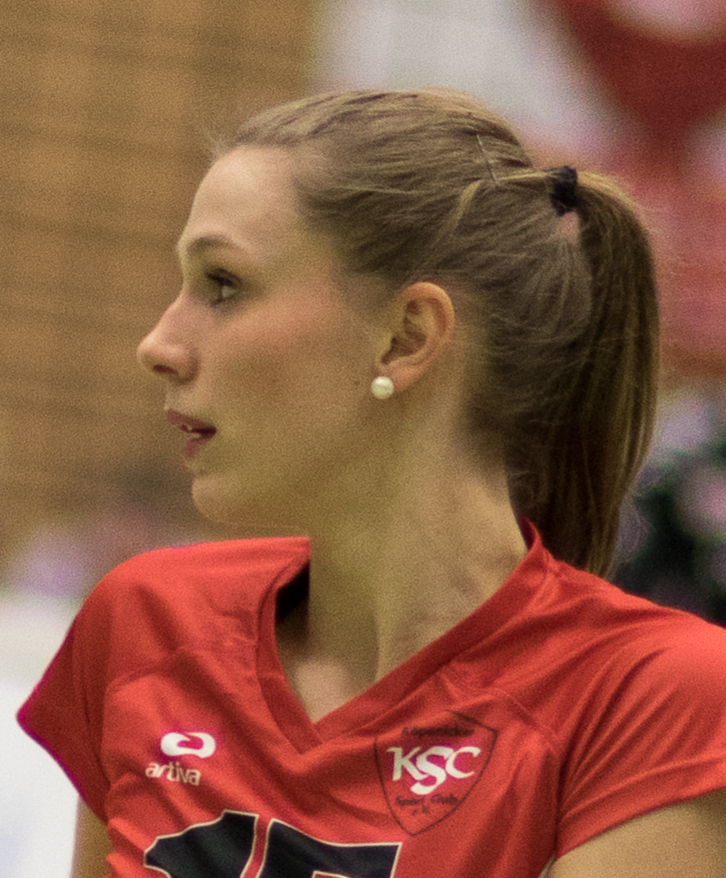
Schubert in 2015

Sophie Schubert (born 26 February 1997) is a German volleyball player.

Schubert joined Köpenicker SC in January 2015, having previously played for VC Olympia Berlin.
